Adrián Czornomaz (born April 30, 1968) is a former Argentine football player. He played as a striker for several teams, mainly from the Argentine Primera B Nacional, of which he is the all-time top goalscorer with 160. He is currently the manager of Talleres RE.

Career 
Czornomaz came through the youth ranks of Argentino de Quilmes, making his debut in the season 1986/87.

Czornomaz also played for Independiente, San Lorenzo de Almagro, Banfield, Belgrano, Quilmes, All Boys, Los Andes, Tucumán, Gimnasia y Esgrima, Tigre, Independiente Rivadavia, Tristán Suárez, Defensa y Justicia and Talleres de Escalada in Argentina, Cobreloa in Chile, SK Rapid Wien in Austria, Universitario and Sporting Cristal in Peru and Tigres de la UANL of Mexico.

Personal life 
Czornomaz is of Ukrainian descent. His son, Nicolás Czornomaz, currently plays for Orange County SC in the United Soccer League.

Titles
 Liga Argentina: 1988/89
 National B: 1992/93
 runner-up of Copa Libertadores: 1997
 Maximum goleador of Liga Argentina of First " B" National (2): 1995/96 and 1998/99
 Maximum goleador of Chile Glass (1): 1990
 Maximum goleador of Decentralized Peruvian: 1996

External links 
 Career statistics at BDFA
 Argentine Primera statistics at Futbol XXI
Adrián Czornomaz at Footballdatabase

References

1968 births
Argentine footballers
All Boys footballers
Atlético Tucumán footballers
Club Atlético Banfield footballers
Club Atlético Belgrano footballers
Cobreloa footballers
Defensa y Justicia footballers
Gimnasia y Esgrima de Jujuy footballers
Club Atlético Independiente footballers
Independiente Rivadavia footballers
Club Atlético Los Andes footballers
Quilmes Atlético Club footballers
San Lorenzo de Almagro footballers
Talleres de Remedios de Escalada footballers
SK Rapid Wien players
Austrian Football Bundesliga players
Sporting Cristal footballers
Club Atlético Tigre footballers
Tigres UANL footballers
Club Universitario de Deportes footballers
Talleres de Remedios de Escalada managers
Argentine Primera División players
Argentine expatriate footballers
Expatriate footballers in Austria
Expatriate footballers in Chile
Expatriate footballers in Mexico
Expatriate footballers in Peru
Argentine people of Ukrainian descent
Living people
Association football forwards
Argentine football managers
Atlético Tucumán managers